Matlameng is a community council located in the Leribe District of Lesotho. Its population in 2006 was 10,238.

Villages
The community of Matlameng includes the villages of Ha Fako, Ha Koasa, Ha Koebu, Ha Lelia, Ha Letele, Ha Liphapang, Ha Mahlehle, Ha Makibinyane, Ha Mashongoane, Ha Matsa (Nkoeng), Ha Mokemane, Ha Mokhubu, Ha Mokopotsa, Ha Mokoroane, Ha Moshoeshoe, Ha Motsatsa, Ha Rankhelepe, Ha Letsie, Ha Sankoela, Ha Sekeleme, Ha Sekhonyana, Ha Sephokoana, Hata-Butle, Lekhoathakhoatha, Makhanfole (Nkoeng), Maqalika, Ntširele, Papalala, Phalole (Nkoeng), Qophello, Sebala-Bala (Nkoeng) and Tšenola.

Rivers
Matlameng has two rivers, Morotong and Morotoaneng.

Education
there are seven Primary schools in Matlameng, Matlameng primary school, Nkola primary school, Chabatsane Primary School, Nkoeng Primary, Potsane Primary, Sefapanong Primary and Hasekhonyana primary.

Matlameng have one High School, Chabatsane Secondary School.

References

External links
 Google map of community villages

Populated places in Leribe District